The Norwood School is a historic school building on Old Norwood Church Road near the unincorporated community of Norwood in south Benton County, Arkansas.  It is a modest single-story stone building, fashioned out of rough-cut local fieldstone, topped by a hip roof with exposed rafter ends.  A pair of entrances are sheltered by a gabled portico supported by a stone arch.  It was built by the Works Progress Administration in 1937, and is the only building of its type in Benton County.  The property also includes an original stone outhouse.

The building was listed on the National Register of Historic Places in January 1988.

See also
National Register of Historic Places listings in Benton County, Arkansas

References

School buildings on the National Register of Historic Places in Arkansas
School buildings completed in 1937
Schools in Benton County, Arkansas
Works Progress Administration in Arkansas
National Register of Historic Places in Benton County, Arkansas
1937 establishments in Arkansas